Cornelius Becker Philip (1900–1987) was an American entomologist, noted for assigning comedic names to species he described.

Works
 Philip, C.B. 1931. The Tabanidae (horseflies) of Minnesota. With special reference to their biologies and taxonomy. Technical Bulletin of the Agricultural Experimental Station, University of Minnesota 80, 132 pp., 4 pls.
 Philip, C.B. 1936. New Tabanidae (horseflies) with notes on certain species of the longus group of Tabanus. Ohio Journal of Science36: 149-156.
 Philip, C.B. 1936. The furcatus group of western North American flies of the genus Chrysops (Diptera: Tabanidae). Proceedings of the Entomological Society of Washington 37[1935]: 153-161. [1936.01.17]
 Philip, C.B. 1936. An interesting new horsefly from North Carolina (Diptera: Tabanidae). Entomological News 47: 229-231. [1936.11.12]
 Philip, C.B. 1937. New horseflies (Tabanidae, Diptera) from the southwestern United States. The Pan-Pacific Entomologist 13: 64-67. [1937.05.04]
 Philip, C.B. 1937. Notes on certain males of North American horseflies (Tabanidae). II. The affinis or 'red-sided' group of Tabanus sens. lat., with a key to the females. The Canadian Entomologist 69: 35-40, 49-58. [1937.05.04]
 Philip, C.B. 1941. Notes on Nearctic Tabaninae (Diptera). Part I. Stenotabanus, Atylotus, and Tabanus s. str.; Part II. Tabanus S. lat. and Hybomitra. The Canadian Entomologist 73: 105-110; 142-153.
 Philip, C.B. 1941. Notes on three western genera of flies (Diptera, Tabanidae). Bulletin of the Brooklyn Entomological Society 36: 185-199.
 Philip, C.B. 1941. Notes on Nearctic Pangoniinae (Diptera, Tabanidae). Proceedings of the Entomological Society of Washington 43: 113-130, 1 pl. [1941.06.27]
 Philip, C.B. 1942. Further notes on Nearctic Tabanidae (Diptera). Proc. New Engl. Zool. Club 21: 55-68.
 Philip, C.B. 1943. New Neotropical Tabanidae (Diptera). Journal of the New York Entomological Society 51: 111-116. [1943.??.??]
 Philip, C.B. 1950. New North American Tabanidae (Diptera). Part II. Tabanidae [sic] [=Tabaninae]; III. Notes on Tabanus molestus and related horseflies with a prominent single row of triangles on the abdomen. Annals of the Entomological Society of America 43: 115-122; 240-248. [1950.04.24]
 Philip, C.B. 1950. New North American Tabanidae (Diptera). Part I. Pangoniinae. Annals of the Entomological Society of America (1949) 42: 451-460. [1950.01.20]
 Philip, C.B. 1953. The genus Chrysozona Meigen in North America (Diptera, Tabanidae). Proceedings of the Entomological Society of Washington 55: 247-251. [1953.11.13]
 Philip, C.B. 1954. New North American Tabanidae, VII. Descriptions of Tabaninae from Mexico (Diptera). American Museum Novitates 1695, 26 pp. [1954.??.??]
 Philip, C.B. 1954. New North American Tabanidae (Diptera). VI. Descriptions of Tabaninae and new distributional data. Annals of the Entomological Society of America 47: 25-33. [1954.05.04]
 Philip, C.B. 1954. New North American Tabanidae. VIII. Notes on and keys to the genera and species of Pangoniinae exclusive of Chrysops. Revista Brasileira de Entomologia 2: 13-60.
 Philip, C.B. 1955. New North American Tabanidae. IX. Notes on and keys to the genus Chrysops Meigen. Revista Brasileira de Entomologia 3: 47-128.
 Philip, C.B. 1956. Records of horseflies in Northeast Asia. Japanese Journal of Sanitary Zoology 7: 221-230. [1956.??.??]
 Philip, C.B. 1957. New records of Tabanidae (Diptera) in the Antilles. American Museum Novitates 1858, 16 pp. [1957.11.29]
 Philip, C.B. 1958. Five new species of Tabanidae (Diptera) from Mexico and Brazil. Journal of the Kansas Entomological Society 31: 177-184. [1958.05.30]
 Philip, C.B. 1958. New records of Tabanidae (Diptera) in the Antilles. Supplemental report. Amer. Mus. Novitates. 1921, 7 pp. [1958.12.31]
 Philip, C.B. 1958. Descriptions of new Neotropical Tabanidae mostly in the California Academy of Sciences (Diptera). The Pan-Pacific Entomologist 34: 63-76. [1958.06.06]
 Philip, C.B. 1959. Tabanidae (Diptera). Philippine Zoological Expedition 1946-1947. Fieldiana, Zoology 33: 543-625, figs. 99-132. [1959.??.??]
 Philip, C.B. 1959. New North American Tabanidae. X. Notes on synonymy, and description of a new species of Chrysops. Transactions of the American Entomological Society 85: 193-217.
 Philip, C.B. 1960. Further records of neotropical Tabanidae (Diptera) mostly from Peru.Proceedings of the California Academy of Sciences (4) 31: 69-102. [1960.07.08]
 Philip, C.B. 1960. Malaysian parasites XXXV. Descriptions of some Tabanidae (Diptera) from the Far East. Stud. Inst. Med. Res., Fed. Malaysia 29: 1-32. [1960.08.17]
 Philip, C.B. 1960. Malaysian parasites XXXV. Descriptions of some Tabanidae (Diptera) from the Far East. Stud. Inst. Med. Res., Fed. Malaysia 29: 1-32. [1960.08.17]
 Philip, C.B. 1960. New North American Tabanidae. XI. Supplemental notes pertinent to a catalog of Nearctic species. Annals of the Entomological Society of America 53: 364-369. [1960.05.31]
 Philip, C.B. 1961. Three new tabanine flies (Tabanidae, Diptera) from the Orient. Indian J Ent. 21 (1959): 82-88. [1961.??.??]
 Philip, C.B. 1961. Further notes on Far Eastern Tabanidae with description of five new species. Pacif. Insects. 3: 473-479. [1961.??.??]
 Philip, C.B. 1961. Additional records of Tabanidae from the west coast of South America (Diptera). The Pan-Pacific Entomologist 37: 111-116. [1961.06.14]
 Philip, C.B. 1961. New North American Tabanidae. XIII. Change of name for a well-known species of Chrysops. Entomological News 72: 160-162. [1961.06.07]
 Philip, C.B. 1962. A review of the Far Eastern biannularis group of Tabanus. Pacific Insects 4: 293-301. [1962.07.30]
 Philip, C.B. 1962. New North American Tabanidae. XVI. A new species from the South Texas Gulf Coast (Diptera). Proceedings of the Entomological Society of Washington 64: 171-174. [1962.10.17]
 Philip, C.B. 1963. Further notes on Far Eastern Tabanidae. II. Descriptions of two new chrysopine flies. Pacific Insects 5: 1-3. [1963.04.30]
 Philip, C.B. 1963. Further notes on Far Eastern Tabanidae. III. Records and new species of Haematopota and a new Chrysops from Malaysia. Pacific Insects 5(3): 519-534. [1963.10.15]
 Philip, C.B. 1966. New North American Tabanidae. XVIII. New species and addenda to a Nearctic catalog. Annals of the Entomological Society of America 59(3): 519-527. 
 Philip, C.B. 1967. Species of Tabanus related to T. xanthogaster Philippi in Chile. Journal of Medical Entomology 4: 463-466.
 Philip, C.B. 1968. Descriptions of new Neotropical Tabanidae and new records for Argentina. Acta Zoologica Lilloana 22[1967]: 105-132. [1968.11.18]
 Philip, C.B. 1968. New North American Tabanidae. XIX. Four new species from Mexico, Honduras, and Arizona. Annals of the Entomological Society of America 61: 380-383.
 Philip, C.B. 1969. New or little known Neotropical Tabanidae (Diptera). The Pan-Pacific Entomologist 45: 137-152.
 Philip, C.B. 1970. Further notes on Oriental Tabanidae (Diptera) IV. Descriptions of Cydistomyia and Tabanus, and other records, particularly from India and Sikkim. pp. 443–452.. In Singh, K. S. & Tandan, B. K. (eds), H. D. Srivastava Commemoration Volume, 653 pp. Indian Veterinary Research Institute, Division of Parasitology, Izatnagar. [1970.??.??]
 Philip, C.B. 1972. A new Tabanus from South Inida (Dipt., Tabanidae). Entomologica Scandinavica 3: 159-160.
 Philip, C.B. 1973. Diptera: Tabanidae from Ceylon. Entomologica Scandinavica (Suppl.) 4: 56-62.
 Philip, C.B. 1974. Further notes on Oriental Tabanidae (Diptera). 5. New species from southeast Asia. J. Med. Entomol. 11: 393-396.
 Philip, C.B. 1977. New North American Tabanidae (Diptera). 23. Additional new Diachlorini from Mexico. Proceedings of the Entomological Society of Washington 79: 28-32. [1977.01.24]
 Philip, C.B. 1978. New North American Tabanidae (Diptera). XXV. The genus Hybomitra and some other new tabanine horse flies in Mexico. The Pan-Pacific Entomologist 54: 107-124. [1978.??.??]
 Philip, C.B. 1978. New North American Tabanidae (Insecta: Diptera). XXIV. Further comments on certain Pangoniinae in Mexico with special reference to Esenbeckia.Proceedings of the California Academy of Sciences (4) 41: 345-356. [1978.??.??]
 Philip, C.B. 1979. Further notes on Far Eastern Tabanidae (Diptera). VI. New and little-known species from the Orient and additional records, particularly from Malaysia. Pacific Insects 21: 179-202. [1979.12.21]
 Philip, C.B. 1980. Further notes on Far Eastern Tabanidae VII. New generalized Oriental species of unusual zoogeographic interest (Diptera). The Pan-Pacific Entomologist 56: 71-78. [1980.??.??]
 Philip, C.B. & Jones, C.M. 1962. New North American Tabanidae. XV. Additions to records of Chrysops in Florida. Florida Entomologist 45: 67-69.
 Philip, C.B. & Mackerras, I.M. 1960. On Asiatic and related Chrysopinae (Diptera: Tabanidae). Philipp, J. Sci. 88 (1959): 279-324

References

1900 births
1987 deaths
American entomologists
20th-century American zoologists
Dipterists